The 2001–02 OB I bajnokság season was the 65th season of the OB I bajnokság, the top level of ice hockey in Hungary. Seven teams participated in the league, and Dunaferr SE Dunaujvaros won the championship.

First round

Second round

Group A 
 Alba Volán Székesfehérvár - Dunaferr SE Dunaújváros 2:1/2:3

Group B

Final 
 Alba Volán Székesfehérvár - Dunaferr SE Dunaújváros 2:4 (5:4 OT, 4:7, 4:2, 1:4, 2:6, 2:5)

External links
 Season on hockeyarchives.info

OB I bajnoksag seasons
Hun
OB